The electoral district of Geelong is an electoral district of the Victorian Legislative Assembly. It centres on inner metropolitan Geelong and following the June 2013 redistribution of electoral boundaries includes the suburbs of Belmont, Breakwater, East Geelong, Geelong, Geelong West, Newtown and South Geelong, Herne Hill, Manifold Heights, Newcomb, Newtown, St Albans Park, Thomson, Whittington and part of Fyansford.

The seat first existed from 1856 to 1859 as a four-member seat. It was split into Geelong East and Geelong West in 1859, but re-created in 1876 as a three-member seat. It was cut back to a two-member seat in 1889, and became a single-member seat in 1904. It was abolished in 1976, but re-created in 1985.

In its current incarnation, it has historically been a marginal seat with demographics similar to the state at large. As such, it was held by the governing party of the day from 1985 to 2010. Incomes vary strongly across the seat.

It was won in 1999 by Ian Trezise for the ALP by 16 votes after recounts. The Victorian Parliament was hung at that election, and the results for the seat of Geelong, which took several days to arrive at, had a significant impact on the events which brought the Bracks government to power. At the 2002 election, the seat's margin grew to 8.1%, however, neither major party considered it safe due to its history as a marginal seat. Trezise narrowly held it for Labor in the 2010 election, becoming the first opposition member for this seat in its current incarnation.

The 2014 Victorian state election saw boundary changes and Christine Couzens retained the seat for the ALP following the retirement of Trezise.

Members for Geelong

Split into Geelong East and Geelong West in 1859.

Election results

Graphical summary

Historical maps

See also

References

External links
 Electorate profile: Geelong District, Victorian Electoral Commission

Electoral districts of Victoria (Australia)
Geelong
1856 establishments in Australia
1859 disestablishments in Australia
1877 establishments in Australia
1976 disestablishments in Australia
1985 establishments in Australia
Golden Plains Shire
Barwon South West (region)